The Artux–Erkeshtam Expressway, commonly referred to as the Ayi Expressway and designated G3013, is a  in the Chinese autonomous region of Xinjiang. It connects the Artux city and Ulugqat County of Kizilsu. It's a spur route of G30.

Route
The former Kashgar–Erkeshtam Expressway begins in the east at the Takuti Bridge of the G3012 Turpan–Hotan Expressway, in the county-level city of Artux. It traverses westward through Ulugqat County, through the village of Ulugqat (also known as Wuqia), which serves as the Chinese immigration checkpoint, before terminating at the border with Kyrgyzstan at Erkeshtam.

The highway is not built to expressway standards for its entire length.

The route and terminius were renamed for several times, originally it's combined with G3012 as "Turpan–Hotan–Erkeshtam Expressway", then in 7918 network G3013 is splitted from G3012, called "Kashgar–Erkeshtam Expressway". In the non-mandatory national standard GB/T 917-2017, the G3013 route is called "Turpan–Erkeshtam Expressway", means that this route is concurrent with G3012 between Turpan and Kashgar, but due to difficults on maintaining route signs, in 2022 plan the G3013 is largely shorten, the current terminius is located at Artux to reflect the actual location of eastern junction.

See also
 Kiziloy

References

Expressways in Xinjiang
Chinese national-level expressways